Prabhat Kumar Samantaray is an Indian politician.  He was elected to the Lok Sabha, the lower house of the Parliament of India from Kendrapara, Odisha as a member of the Biju Janata Dal.

References

External links
Official biographical sketch in Parliament of India website

India MPs 1998–1999
India MPs 1999–2004
Lok Sabha members from Odisha
Biju Janata Dal politicians
Janata Dal politicians
1950 births
Living people